Shangyuan may refer to:

Shangyuan Festival, also known as the Lantern Festival in English

Places in China
Shangyuan, Beipiao (上园), a town in Beipiao, Liaoning
Shangyuan Subdistrict (上园街道), a subdistrict in Dadong District, Shenyang, Liaoning

Historical eras
Shangyuan (上元, 674–676), era name used by Emperor Gaozong of Tang
Shangyuan (上元, 760–761), era name used by Emperor Suzong of Tang

See also
Sangyuan (disambiguation)